The 1963–64 NHL season was the 47th season of the National Hockey League. Six teams each played 70 games. The Toronto Maple Leafs won their third consecutive Stanley Cup by defeating the Detroit Red Wings four games to three in the final series.

Offseason

The biggest trade of the offseason took place in June 1963, with the New York Rangers and the Montreal Canadiens swapping starting goaltenders. Ranger Gump Worsley went to Montreal, along with Dave Balon, Leon Rochefort and minor-leaguer Len Ronson, for six-time Vezina Trophy winner Jacques Plante – whose relationship with Canadiens' coach Toe Blake had seriously soured – along with Don Marshall and Phil Goyette. Among other noteworthy transactions was the Boston Bruins drafting former Norris Trophy winner Tom Johnson from Montreal. Howie Young of the Red Wings, who'd likewise worn out his welcome in Detroit, was traded to the Chicago Black Hawks for goaltender Roger Crozier, who would make an immediate impact in Detroit. Billy Reay, the former coach of the Maple Leafs who had been coaching the Buffalo Bisons of the American Hockey League, was named coach of the Black Hawks, a position he would hold for a record thirteen seasons.

At the league meeting on June 5, the governors noted the death of William Northey, who had died in April at age 92, and established a memorial on behalf of Montreal Children's Hospital in Northey's name. It was announced at the league's October 4 meeting that Ron Andrews would replace Ken McKenzie, whose work as publisher and editor of The Hockey News was taking priority, as the NHL's director of publicity. Furthermore, the waiver rules were liberalized, so that a player not on the 20-man protected list submitted in June could be dispatched to the minors without clearing waivers.

The 17th National Hockey League All-Star Game was held on October 5 in Toronto and resulted in a 3–3 tie between the Stanley Cup champion Maple Leafs and the NHL All-Stars. Frank Mahovlich, who scored on two of Toronto's goals and assisted on the third, was named Most Valuable Player. Stan Mikita of the Black Hawks, the First Team All-Star center, at the time unsigned, was not permitted to play. Unusually, six All-Stars were named from the Boston Bruins – John Bucyk, Leo Boivin, Murray Oliver, Dean Prentice, Doug Mohns and Tom Johnson – the most of any other team, although the Bruins had finished the 1963 season in last place.

Regular season
Plante made his debut as a Ranger on October 9 against Chicago, losing 3–1 and being cut by an elbow from Black Hawk Johnny McKenzie. He fared no better four nights later in the home opener in Montreal against the Canadiens, losing 6–2 in the Forum while the fans both applauded and jeered their former goaltender.

While Mikita signed his contract in time for the start of the season, star defenceman Carl Brewer of the Maple Leafs was a holdout and claimed he was going to retire from hockey to attend the University of Toronto; contract terms were agreed upon by the end of October.

Montreal defeated the Red Wings 6–4 in Detroit, but the highlight of the game was Gordie Howe scoring his 544th goal to tie Maurice Richard's all-time career goal scoring mark and he drew a five-minute ovation from the capacity crowd.

Toronto defeated Montreal 6–3 at Maple Leaf Gardens on October 30 in a penalty-filled game; the most prominent fight featured Canadien Terry Harper and Maple Leaf Bob Pulford who drew fighting majors. There were two lasting consequences; Canadien goaltender Gump Worsley badly pulled his hamstring in the match and was eventually replaced by Charlie Hodge for the remainder of the season. Furthermore, on November 8, Maple Leaf Gardens became the first arena in the NHL to have separate penalty boxes installed.

The first penalty shot of the season was taken on November 3, with the Canadiens defeating the Rangers 5–3 in Madison Square Garden. Don Marshall, having been tripped by Jean Beliveau of Montreal, took the shot, but Canadien goaltender Charlie Hodge made the save. Nonetheless, the Rangers' management was not happy with the officiating of referee Vern Buffey, and called for the removal of referee-in-chief Carl Voss, a demand rejected by league president Clarence Campbell.

Detroit defeated the Canadiens 3–0 on November 10. Famously, two longtime career records were set in this match. Gordie Howe scored a shorthanded goal on Charlie Hodge for his 545th career goal, breaking Maurice Richard's record. Further, Detroit netminder Terry Sawchuk recorded his 94th career NHL shutout, tying him with George Hainsworth as the all-time NHL shutout leader. Howe would hold the all-time career goalscoring record for thirty seasons until broken by Wayne Gretzky in 1994, while Sawchuk would hold the all-time shutout record for forty-five seasons, when it was broken in 2009 by Martin Brodeur.

By late November it was clear to Ranger management that Doug Harvey had lost his form entirely and was given his release. He finished out the season in the AHL with the Quebec Aces.

Another career milestone fell on December 4, when Andy Hebenton of the Bruins broke the all-time career iron man streak, playing in his 581st consecutive game, to surpass Johnny Wilson's mark. He would extend the streak to 630 games, his last in the NHL, while continuing his career in the minors, where he would play ten more straight seasons without missing a match.

An unusual record fell on December 12, in a Montreal–New York match won 6–4 by the Canadiens. Dave Balon and Gilles Tremblay of Montreal and Camille Henry of the Rangers scored goals within a frame of eighteen seconds, setting a mark for the fastest three goals by two teams.

In a game on December 22 when Montreal exploded for five goals in nine minutes of the second period in a 6–1 win against Detroit, Canadien Jean Beliveau scored a goal to make him the highest scoring center in league history.

Rookie Detroit goaltender Roger Crozier, substituting for injured Terry Sawchuk, recorded his second shutout against Boston on January 7. Only 7,000 fans attended in Boston Garden to see the last place Bruins play, chanting "We shall overcome" to register their opinion on their team's performance.

On January 18, Terry Sawchuk broke George Hainsworth's NHL career shutout record with his 95th in a 2–0 win over Montreal. That same night, cellar dwelling Boston staggered the Maple Leafs 11–0 in Toronto, Andy Hebenton and Dean Prentice each scoring hat tricks.

On February 1, Montreal forward Bobby Rousseau scored five goals against Detroit in a 9–3 whipping of the Red Wings, one behind the league record for a single game and the first time five goals had been scored by a player in a single match in nearly a decade.

A trade rumored most of the season finally took place on February 22 when the New York Rangers traded Andy Bathgate – whom the Maple Leafs had coveted for some time – and Don McKenney to Toronto in exchange for Dick Duff, Bob Nevin, Arnie Brown, Bill Collins and Rod Seiling. Ranger fans did not like the deal and in the next game chants of "Muzz must go!" were heard, referring to Muzz Patrick, the Rangers' general manager. However, Bathgate – his days as a scoring star through – and McKenney both would be gone from Toronto by the end of the next season, while Seiling, Nevin and Brown would star for the Rangers for many years to come.

Several players scored their 200th goal in the season, with Camille Henry of the Rangers scoring his against Boston on October 20, Bobby Hull of the Black Hawks against the Rangers on December 11, Dean Prentice of the Bruins against the Hawks on December 12, as well as George Armstrong and Frank Mahovlich.

Goaltender Eddie Johnston played every minute of all 70 games for the Boston Bruins, the last time in NHL history a goaltender played every minute of every game.

The regular season title was secured by the Canadiens after Chicago, which had a substantial lead halfway through the season, played little better than .500 hockey the rest of the way; a Habs' 2–1 win against the Rangers on the road the last game of the season was needed to nose ahead of the Black Hawks, which had never to that date finished first in the league standings.

Final standings

Playoffs
For the first time since the league began using the best-of-seven playoff format in 1939, all three series went the full seven games.

Playoff bracket

Semifinals
The playoffs had the same match-ups as the previous season in each round with the two Canadian teams, Toronto and Montreal, and two American teams, Detroit and Chicago meeting in Semifinals. As with the previous season, the Maple Leafs ousted the Canadiens and the Red Wings again defeated the Black Hawks.

(1) Montreal Canadiens vs. (3) Toronto Maple Leafs

(2) Chicago Black Hawks vs. (4) Detroit Red Wings

Stanley Cup Finals

Awards

All-Star teams

Player statistics

Scoring leaders
Note: GP = Games played, G = Goals, A = Assists, Pts = Points, PIM = Penalties in minutes

Leading goaltenders

Note: GP = Games played; Min = Minutes played; GA = Goals against; GAA = Goals against average; W = Wins; L = Losses; T = Ties; SO = Shutouts

Coaches
Boston Bruins: Milt Schmidt
Chicago Black Hawks: Billy Reay
Detroit Red Wings: Sid Abel
Montreal Canadiens: Toe Blake
New York Rangers: Red Sullivan
Toronto Maple Leafs: Punch Imlach

Debuts
The following is a list of players of note who played their first NHL game in 1963–64 (listed with their first team):

Gary Dornhoefer, Boston Bruins
Ted Irvine, Boston Bruins
Phil Esposito, Chicago Black Hawks
Roger Crozier, Detroit Red Wings
Ted Harris, Montreal Canadiens
John Ferguson, Montreal Canadiens
Yvan Cournoyer, Montreal Canadiens
Jimmy Roberts, Montreal Canadiens
Gilles Villemure, New York Rangers
Jim Pappin, Toronto Maple Leafs
Ron Ellis, Toronto Maple Leafs

Last games
The following is a list of players of note that played their last game in the NHL in 1963–64 (listed with their last team):
Andy Hebenton, Boston Bruins
Jerry Toppazzini, Boston Bruins
Ed Litzenberger, Toronto Maple Leafs

See also 
 1963-64 NHL transactions
 List of Stanley Cup champions
 NHL Amateur Draft
 1963 NHL Amateur Draft
 National Hockey League All-Star Game
 Ice hockey at the 1964 Winter Olympics
 1963 in sports
 1964 in sports

Further reading

References

Citations

Sources
 
 
 

 
1963–64 in American ice hockey by league
1963–64 in Canadian ice hockey by league